ODOT may refer to:

 Ohio Department of Transportation
 Oklahoma Department of Transportation
 Oregon Department of Transportation
 Circled dot (disambiguation)